Sverdlovo is the name of several rural localities in Russia:

Sverdlovo, Leningrad Oblast, a rural locality in Leningrad Oblast
Sverdlovo, name of several other rural localities

See also
Sverdlovsk (disambiguation)
Sverdlovsky (disambiguation)
Yakov Sverdlov